"Tout l'or des hommes" (meaning "All the Men's Gold") is the first hit single from Celine Dion's 2003 album, 1 fille & 4 types. It was released on 6 October 2003 in selected countries. "Tout l'or des hommes" was written by Jacques Veneruso, who wrote Dion's previous French hit "Sous le vent". The song was produced by Erick Benzi, who worked with Dion on D'eux in 1995 and S'il suffisait d'aimer in 1998.

Background and release
The music video, directed by Yannick Saillet, was shot in May 2003 in the Mojave Desert and released in October 2003. It was included on the "Tout l'or des hommes" DVD single and Dion's 2005 video compilation On ne change pas. The making of "Tout l'or des hommes" video appeared on the 1 fille & 4 types limited edition and the On ne change pas DVD as well.

On 1 October 2003 Dion taped the 1 fille & 4 types TV special at the Caesars Palace in Las Vegas, where she performed this song among others.

"Tout l'or des hommes" became a hit spending eight weeks at number 1 on the Quebec Singles Chart and three weeks atop the Polish Singles Chart. It reached the top 10 in the Francophone countries, including number 3 in France where it was certified gold for selling 250,000 copies. "Tout l'or des hommes" became the highest-charting French-language single on the Canadian Singles Chart, peaking at number 2, but Audrey De Montigny's "Même les anges" matched this peak a month later, allowing the two songs to share the achievement.

It was featured later on Dion's 2005 greatest hits album, On ne change pas.

"Tout l'or des hommes" was performed by Dion on 13 May 2008 in Belgium, during her Taking Chances World Tour as well as her concerts in the 2013 Sans attendre Tour. The latter performance was included as a bonus in her Céline une seule fois / Live 2013 CD.

Critical reception
Rob Theakston of AllMusic highlighted this song. David Browne of EW said "she and her guys offer up reverby twang in Tout l'Or des Hommes (All the Men's Gold.)"

Track listing and formats

 Canadian CD single
 "Tout l'or des hommes" – 2:58
 "Tu nages" – 3:09
 European CD single
 "Tout l'or des hommes" – 2:58
 "Tu nages" – 3:09
 "Tout l'or des hommes" (Instrumantal Version) – 2:58

 French DVD single
 "Tout l'or des hommes" (Music Video) – 4:07
 "Tout l'or des hommes" (Karaoke) – 4:07
 German 3" CD single
 "Tout l'or des hommes" – 2:58
 "Sous le vent" – 3:30

Charts

Weekly charts

Year-end charts

Certifications and sales

Release history

References

Celine Dion songs
2003 singles
French-language songs
Number-one singles in Poland
Songs written by Jacques Veneruso
2003 songs
Columbia Records singles
Epic Records singles